Anilite bombs, also known as Gros Andreau bombs, were introduced early in the First World War for dropping from aircraft.

Description
The Anilite bomb consisted of two compartments; one filled with gaseous Nitrogen Dioxide (NO2) and another filled with Gasoline or any other suitable / available hydrocarbon to proportions of 80% NO2 and 20% hydrocarbon as oxidiser and fuel respectively.

Once released the two components mixed inside the casing becoming explosive after mixing. This gave the advantage of relatively safe handling with low risk of premature detonation, even with rough handling. If the bomb components did not mix or the gas leaked, the bomb became an incendiary device. Disadvantages included the toxicity of the NO2 if leakage occurred, with several instances of crews being poisoned and incapacitated by leaking bombs and the relative fragile nature of the casing which meant that the bombs had none or little penetration on impact, limiting their effectiveness.

The Gros Andreau bombs were produced in three calibres:
 weighing , containing  of explosive.
 weighing , containing  of explosive.
 weighing , containing  of explosive.

Operational history
Gros Andreau bombs proved effective and relatively safe to use and were first dropped on Karlsruhe on 22 June 1916, being withdrawn from use in 1918 and replaced with bombs filled with Melinite (picric acid and guncotton) and Mononitronaphthalene known as MMN bombs.

References

Aerial bombs
Aerial bombing
Explosive weapons